This is a list of results for the Legislative Council at the 1988 New South Wales state election.

Results

Continuing members 

The following MLCs were not up for re-election this year.

See also 

 Results of the 1988 New South Wales state election (Legislative Assembly)
 Candidates of the 1988 New South Wales state election
 Members of the New South Wales Legislative Council, 1988–1991

References 

1988 Legislative Council
New South Wales Legislative Council